Phlegmacium subfraudulosum is a species of mushroom producing fungus in the family Cortinariaceae. It was previously known as Cortinarius subfraudulosus.

Taxonomy 
The species was described in 2014 and classified as Cortinarius subfraudulosus. It was placed in the subgenus Phlegmacium of the large mushroom genus Cortinarius.

In 2022 the species was transferred from Cortinarius and reclassified as Phlegmacium subfoetidum based on genomic data.

Etymology 
The specific epithet subfraudulosus referred to its similarity to Cortinarius fraudulosus (since reclassified as Phlegmacium fraudulosum). With its reclassification the specific epithet was changed to subfraudulosum.

Habitat and distribution 
Found in Fennoscandia and Estonia, where it grows on the ground in hemiboreal and boreal forests.

See also

List of Cortinarius species

References

External links

subfraudulosus
Fungi described in 2014
Fungi of Europe